Dhoke Budhal (Urdu:ڈھوک بدہال) (U.C Narali) is a village in Rawalpindi District.

Etymology
In the Pothohari dialect of Punjabi, "Dhoke"  means a small chunk of people or houses, while Budhal is the title given to a specified group of "Awan" Tribe.
As most of the inhabitants (about 98%) of this village are "Budhal" descents of "Awan" tribe so the name is given to depict the peoples as "Group of Budhals".

Geography
The village is located at 33° 08' 00.60" N and 73° 09' 48.60" E in the northern part of Union Council Narali. 
Dhoke Manna is bordering North East side of village, Miana Mohra touches the boundary of Dhoke Budhal to South-East, Narali is located in south, while north west side is covered by PPL oil fields and Village Mastala.

History
It is believed that Qadi Khan قادى خان (Awan tribal leader), moved to Narali from Dora Budhal ڈوره بدھال during the 18th century. When, how and why Budhals moved to current location of Dhoke Budhal is not known. The presence of only one tribe (i.e. Awan) and all Sunni Muslims indicates that either this community never accepted outsiders or other communities not tried to move in this village.

Populated places in Rawalpindi District